Pardee Dam is a -high structure across the Mokelumne River which marks the boundary between Amador and Calaveras Counties, located in the foothills of the Sierra Nevada approximately  northeast of Stockton.

History
Construction of the Pardee Dam began in July 1927.  It was completed in 1929 with the first release of water into the Mokelumne Aqueduct occurring on June 23, 1929.

Overview
The impounded water forms Pardee Reservoir, the primary source of water for the East Bay Municipal Utility District (EBMUD) in the San Francisco Bay Area. Like all the reservoirs in the Sierra watershed, most of the water originates from the annual snowpack in the High Sierra. California state law prohibits human body to water contact within Pardee Reservoir, so water skiers, jet skis, and lake swimmers are forbidden, but boating and fishing remain popular activities. The water is transported from Pardee Reservoir across the Central Valley via the triple steel pipe Mokelumne Aqueduct to several storage reservoirs located in the hills east of San Francisco Bay which supply drinking water to the East Bay region. The water is also used to generate electric power and for recreation.

Both the dam and its reservoir are named for George Pardee, a prominent Progressive Era politician in the Bay Area who also served as Governor of California.

Salmon Activity 
Due to the many dams along the Mokelumne River, salmon runs that used to cross through to the present location of the Pardee Reservoir are stopped short in lower sections of the river. In the Fall of 2014, the fifth largest Chinook salmon count recorded in the past 74 years took place, with over 12,118 salmon. Below the dam lies a hatchery that is the result of a joint project with EBMUD and California Department of Fish and Wildlife. There, about a fourth of the returning salmon are collected and harvested for egg production. Along with raising the salmon, scientists work to manipulate river flow to encourage more salmon to return. During times of low water level, the fish are at risk of being drawn into water pumps that lead towards the south past the delta. To avoid this, scientists truck the baby salmon from the hatchery to Sherman Island in the delta. The goal of the hatchery is that the baby salmon will imprint to the water in the Mokelumne River and return when it is time for them to mate.

See also
List of dams and reservoirs in California
List of lakes in California
List of largest reservoirs of California
List of the tallest dams in the United States

References

Columbia Gazetteer (2000), 
EBMUD history

External links
EBMUD Daily water supply report
Current Conditions, Pardee Reservoir, California Department of Water Resources
St. Mary's Magazine
"Bumper Run of River Salmon"

Buildings and structures in Amador County, California
Buildings and structures in Calaveras County, California
Dams in California
San Joaquin River
United States local public utility dams
Dams completed in 1929
East Bay Municipal Utility District
Energy infrastructure completed in 1929
Arch dams
Dams on the Mokelumne River
Historic American Engineering Record in California
1929 establishments in California